The 1905 World Allround Speed Skating Championships took place at 21 and 22 January 1905 at the ice rink Stadspark in Groningen, Netherlands.

Sigurd Mathisen was defending champion. He did not participate and did not defend his title.

Coen de Koning won three of the four distances and became World champion.

Allround results 

  * = Fell
 NC = Not classified
 NF = Not finished
 NS = Not started
 DQ = Disqualified
Source: SpeedSkatingStats.com

Rules 
Four distances have to be skated:
 500m
 1500m
 5000m
 10000m

One could only win the World Championships by winning at least three of the four distances, so there would be no World Champion if no skater won at least three distances.

Silver and bronze medals were not awarded.

References 

1905 World Allround
World Allround, 1905
World Allround Speed Skating Championships, 1905
1905 in Dutch sport
January 1905 sports events
Sports competitions in Groningen (city)